Showa-ike is an earthfill dam located in Yamaguchi prefecture in Japan. The dam is used for irrigation. The catchment area of the dam is 91 km2. The dam impounds about 2  ha of land when full and can store 120 thousand cubic meters of water. The construction of the dam was started on 1939 and completed in 1945.

References

Dams in Yamaguchi Prefecture
1945 establishments in Japan